Qarah Khvojalu (also Romanized as Qarah Khvojalū and Qarah Khvojālū) is a village in Zangebar Rural District, in the Central District of Poldasht County, West Azerbaijan Province, Iran. At the 2006 census, its population was 325, in 63 families.

References 

Populated places in Poldasht County